Haplochromis flavipinnis is a species of cichlid endemic to Lake Victoria though it may now be extinct. This species can reach a length of  SL.

References

flavipinnis
Fish described in 1906
Taxonomy articles created by Polbot